The 2018 FIBA Under-18 Asian Championship was the 25th edition of the Asian Championship for Junior Men aged 18 years old and below. The tournament was held in Nonthaburi, Thailand from August 5 to 11. 

The top four teams qualified and will represent FIBA Asia in the 2019 FIBA Under-19 Basketball World Cup in Greece.

Qualification

Qualified teams 

 Host Nation (1)
 
 Defending Champions (1)
 
 Central Asia (1)
 
 East Asia (4)
 
 
 
 

 the Gulf (2)
 
 
 South Asia (1)
 
 Southeast Asia (2)
 
 
 West Asia (2)
 
 
 Oceania (2)

Format
This edition of the tournament will be using a different format as compared to what was used since 2010. While there would still be a preliminary round robin of four groups of four teams, the single-elimination final round immediately follows the preliminary round. In the final round, the teams that finished second and third in their respective groups would play in the qualifications to quarterfinals of the final round, while the group winners automatically qualify to the quarterfinals proper.

Draw
Prior to the draw, the 16 teams were separated into 4 pots based on the latest FIBA Boys' World Ranking, as shown within the parenthesis.

The Draw ceremony was held on July 6 at Mono 29 Stadium in Nonthaburi, Thailand. Teams in each pot were distributed into four groups, with the host nation picking their group. Thailand eventually decided to be drawn in Group C, along with Bahrain and newcomers Australia & New Zealand.

Venues
Most games were held at Stadium 29, located in the Bangkok suburb of Nonthaburi. A few games were held at the Thai-Japanese Bangkok Youth Center in Bangkok.

Preliminary round
All times are local (UTC+7).

Group A

Group B

Group C

Group D

Final round

Brackets

5-8th place

Qualification round

Quarterfinals

5th-8th-place semifinals

Semifinals

7th-place game

5th-place game

Bronze-medal match

Final

Statistical leaders

Players

Points

Rebounds

Assists

Steals

Blocks

Other statistical leaders

Final rankings

References

FIBA Asia Under-18 Championship
2018–19 in Asian basketball
International basketball competitions hosted by Thailand
August 2018 sports events in Asia